Argentina striata, the striated argentine, is a species of fish in the family Argentinidae found in the western Atlantic Ocean from Nova Scotia in Canada to Uruguay where it occurs at depths of .

References
Gareth J. Nelson, Gill arches of some Teleostean fishes of the families Salangidae and Argentinidae, Japanese Journal of Ichthyology, Vol. 17, No. 2, 1970.
 

Argentinidae
Fish of the Western Atlantic
Fish described in 1896